Saint Anastasia or Santa Anastasia may refer to one of several saints, including:

 Basilissa and Anastasia of Rome (fl. c. 68), martyrs
 Anastasia the Roman (fl. c. 253), martyr
 Anastasia of Sirmium from Rome (fl. c. 304), martyr
 Anastasia the Patrician from Byzantium (fl. 576), Byzantine lady-in-waiting and hermit in Egypt
 Athanasia of Aegina (also Anastasia; c. 790–860), who lived in the Byzantine Empire and advised Empress Theodora II
 Saint Anastasia of Serbia (fl. 1196), Princess consort of Serbia
 Grand Duchess Anastasia Nikolaevna of Russia, canonized by the Russian Orthodox Church in 2000

See also
 Saint Anastasia (disambiguation), for the use of the term other than for people
 Anastasia (disambiguation)
 Anastasia (name)

Female saints